The National Museum of Racing and Hall of Fame was founded in 1950 in Saratoga Springs, New York, to honor the achievements of American Thoroughbred race horses, jockeys, and trainers. In 1955, the museum moved to its current location on Union Avenue near Saratoga Race Course, at which time inductions into the hall of fame began. Each spring, following the tabulation of the final votes, the announcement of new inductees is made, usually during Kentucky Derby Week in early May. The actual inductions are held in mid-August during the Saratoga race meeting.

The Hall of Fame's nominating committee selects eight to ten candidates from among the four Contemporary categories (male horse, female horse, jockey and trainer) to be presented to the voters. Changes in voting procedures that commenced with the 2010 candidates allow the voters to choose multiple candidates from a single Contemporary category, instead of a single candidate from each of the four Contemporary categories. For example, in 2016, two female horses (Rachel Alexandra and Zenyatta) were inducted at the same time.

The museum also houses a large collection of art, artifacts, and memorabilia that document the history of horse racing from the eighteenth century to the present.

History
The National Museum of Racing was founded in 1950, led by Cornelius Vanderbilt Whitney and a group of people interested in thoroughbred racing. The museum first opened its doors in 1951, at which time it occupied a single room in Saratoga's Canfield Casino. The establishment was supported by the city of Saratoga Springs, which donated $2,500, the Saratoga Racing Association, which donated $5,000, and various patrons of the sport, who also donated various pieces of art and memorabilia. The first item in the museum's collection was a horseshoe worn by the great Lexington.

In 1955, the museum relocated to its current location on Union Avenue, across the street of the main entrance of the historic Saratoga Race Course. The museum was relocated to a newly reconstructed building and a thoroughbred racing Hall of Fame was included. Since then, the museum has expanded several times to allow for the display of its extensive art collection and more multimedia displays on the history of the sport.

Horses in the Hall of Fame

In the early years, inductions to the hall of fame were based on the evaluation of a panel of racing historians. In 1955, a group of 9 horses from the earliest years of the American turf were inducted. The 1956 class included 11 horses that raced around the turn of the century, while the 1957 class included 10 horses that raced up to the mid-thirties. Since then, the classes have been significantly smaller as the inductions shifted to more contemporary horses. Under current rules, a horse must have been retired for a minimum of five full calendar years to be eligible for the hall of fame. Thoroughbreds remain eligible in the contemporary category between five and 25 calendar years following their final racing year. Thoroughbreds retired for more than 25 calendar years may become eligible through the Historic Review Committee.

Source: National Museum of Racing and Hall

Jockeys in the Hall of Fame
Contemporary jockeys become eligible for the Hall of Fame after they have been licensed for at least 20 years, and remain eligible until 25 years after retirement. In special circumstances such as fragile health, the 20 year requirement may be waived, though there is usually a five-year waiting period after retirement in such cases.

Source: National Museum of Racing and Hall of Fame

Legend: * Still active (+ Win totals from Equibase.com ) ** Wins in North America only

Trainers in the Hall of Fame
Contemporary trainers become eligible for the Hall of Fame after they have been licensed for at least 25 years, and remain eligible until 25 years after retirement. In special circumstances such as fragile health, the 25 year requirement may be waived though there is usually a five-year waiting period after retirement in such cases.

Presidents

Exemplars of Racing

Pillars of the Turf
Established in 2013, the Hall of Fame states that the Pillars of the Turf category honors those "who have made extraordinary contributions to Thoroughbred racing in a leadership or pioneering capacity at the highest national level."

Museum Exhibits
In addition to the Hall of Fame, the museum houses numerous exhibits. These include:

 The Link Gallery, which features a bronze statue, Seasick, and a rotating selection of paintings
 The Sculpture Gallery, which features work by June Harrah, Herbert Haseltine, Marilyn Newmark, Jim Reno, John Skeaping and Eleanor Iselin Wade, among others. The gallery looks out onto the inner courtyard, which features a life-size bronze of Secretariat by Skeaping
 The Colonial Gallery, which covers the ocean transportation of horses and the foundations of American racing
 The Pre-Civil War Gallery, covering the expansion of racing during the early 19th century
 The Post-Civil War Gallery, covering the continued expansion of racing after the Civil War until a backlash to gambling in the early 20th century led to the closure of many tracks
 The 20th Century Gallery, which covers more recent topics
 The Eclipse Gallery, featuring award-winning entries from the Eclipse Award photography competition
 The Racing Day Gallery, which features displays about jockeys, odds and the Breeders' Cup
 The Anatomy Room, covering the breeding and biology of the Thoroughbred
 The Triple Crown Gallery, including information and artifacts related to Triple Crown history
 The Steeplechase Gallery, covering the history of steeplechase racing in America
 The von Stade Gallery, which displays a selection of paintings, works on paper, or photographic prints from the Museum Collection
 The Peter McBean Gallery, which houses temporary exhibitions, a semi-permanent Hall of Fame Heroes exhibition and seasonal exhibitions. It also houses a collection bequeathed by John Nerud, including trophies and paintings of the Hall of Fame horses he trained, Gallant Man and Dr. Fager

The Museum Collection includes just over 300 paintings. These range from paintings of the early days of racing in England by John E. Ferneley Sr. to more contemporary champions by Richard Stone Reeves. Featured artists include: William Smithson Broadhead, Vaughn Flannery, Sir Alfred J. Munnings, Frederic Remington, Martin Stainforth, George Stubbs, Henry Stull, Edward Troye and Franklin Brooke Voss. Also on display are Kelso's five Jockey Club Gold Cup trophies and the Triple Crown trophies of Count Fleet.

See also
 Australian Racing Hall of Fame
 British Steeplechasing Hall of Fame
 British National Horseracing Museum
 Canadian Horse Racing Hall of Fame
 Japan Racing Association Hall of Fame
 Harness Racing Museum & Hall of Fame
 New Zealand Racing Hall of Fame
 Aiken Thoroughbred Racing Hall of Fame and Museum

References

External links
 

Horse racing organizations in the United States
Equestrian museums in the United States
Sports museums in New York (state)
Museums in Saratoga County, New York
Horse racing museums and halls of fame
Horse Racing
Buildings and structures in Saratoga Springs, New York
Museums established in 1951
Tourist attractions in Saratoga Springs, New York
1951 establishments in New York (state)